Melanie Jayne Lynskey (born 16 May 1977) is a New Zealand actress. Known for her portrayals of complex women and her command of American dialects, she works predominantly in independent films. Lynskey is the recipient of two Critics' Choice Awards, a HCA Award, a Gracie, a New Zealand Film Award, a Hollywood Film Award, and a Sundance Special Jury Award, as well as Gotham, Satellite, Saturn, Golden Nymph, Independent Spirit, Screen Actors Guild, and Primetime Emmy Award nominations.

Lynskey made her screen debut in Heavenly Creatures (1994), earning a New Zealand Film Award for her portrayal of teenage murderess Pauline Parker. She later appeared in various international productions, including Ever After (1998), Detroit Rock City, But I'm a Cheerleader, The Cherry Orchard (all 1999), Coyote Ugly (2000), Snakeskin (2001), Shooters, Abandon, and Sweet Home Alabama (all 2002). After moving to the United States, Lynskey became known as a character actor, gaining recognition for a mix of big-budget and small-scale film projects, such as Shattered Glass (2003), Flags of Our Fathers (2006), Away We Go, Up in the Air, The Informant!, Leaves of Grass (all 2009), Win Win (2011), Seeking a Friend for the End of the World, The Perks of Being a Wallflower (both 2012), They Came Together (2014), and Don't Look Up (2021).

In 2012, Lynskey received critical acclaim and a Gotham Award nomination for her starring role as a depressed divorcee in Hello I Must Be Going, which proved to be a turning point in her career. Subsequent lead parts in The Big Ask (2013), Happy Christmas, We'll Never Have Paris, Goodbye to All That (all 2014), The Intervention, Rainbow Time, Little Boxes (all 2016), I Don't Feel at Home in This World Anymore, And Then I Go (both 2017), Sadie (2018), and Lady of the Manor (2021) established her as a prominent figure in the American independent film community.

Outside of film, Lynskey achieved fame with her portrayal of Rose on the CBS sitcom Two and a Half Men (2003–2015), and earned a Critics' Choice nomination for playing Michelle Pierson on the HBO series Togetherness (2015–2016). She provided the voices of Beatrice for Cartoon Network's Over the Garden Wall (2014) and Megan for Disney XD's Future-Worm! (2016–2018). After starring as Molly Strand on the first season of Hulu's Castle Rock in 2018, Lynskey appeared as Rosemary Thomson in the FX miniseries Mrs. America (2020), and as Betty Gore in the Hulu miniseries Candy (2022), receiving a nomination for the 2023 Critics' Choice Award for Best Supporting Actress for the latter. In 2021, she debuted in the lead role of Shauna on Showtime's Yellowjackets, for which she won the 2022 Critics' Choice Award for Best Actress in a Drama Series and was nominated for the 2022 Primetime Emmy Award for Outstanding Lead Actress. Lynskey is married to actor Jason Ritter, with whom she has a daughter.

Early life 
Lynskey was born in New Plymouth, New Zealand, to Kay Lynskey, a real estate agent, and Tim Lynskey, an orthopedic surgeon. She is the eldest of five children, and has three brothers and one sister. Her surname is Irish.

During her childhood, Lynskey's family moved to England for one year before returning to New Zealand. She attended New Plymouth Girls' High School, where she was involved in the drama department and school plays. After high school, Lynskey studied at Victoria University of Wellington.

Career

1994–2002: Film debut and early work 

Lynskey's professional acting debut came at age 16 with a starring role in Heavenly Creatures (1994), a psychological drama based on the Parker–Hulme murder case. Lynskey played Pauline Parker, a teenager who carries out a brutal crime with the assistance of her best friend (played by Kate Winslet). She auditioned for the role when a casting director visited her high school; prior to this, five hundred girls had been considered for the part of Pauline, but "none were right". Fran Walsh, the film's co-writer, admired Lynskey's "quiet intensity" and said, "we knew immediately that she was right for the role". Heavenly Creatures was met with critical acclaim upon its release. Roger Ebert praised its director—Peter Jackson—for picking "the right two actresses", noting that "there is a way Lynskey has of looking up from beneath glowering eyebrows that lets you know her insides are churning". Owen Gleiberman of Entertainment Weekly described her work as "extraordinary", while Richard Corliss stated in his review for Time:

Heavenly Creatures is recognized as a landmark in New Zealand cinema. It was nominated for Best Original Screenplay at the 67th Academy Awards, while Lynskey was named Best Actress at the 1995 New Zealand Film Awards. She regards working with Jackson and Winslet as an important learning experience. During the making of the film she grew particularly close to Winslet, who later said, "Mel is like the left side of my body. [We] had the exact relationship in terms of communication and love that Pauline and Juliet had. From the minute we saw each other".

Following a three-year hiatus—during which she attended university, auditioned for a part in The Crucible (1996), and had a non-speaking cameo in Peter Jackson's The Frighteners (1996)—Lynskey secured a leading role in the independent drama Foreign Correspondents, which was filmed in Los Angeles in 1997 and garnered attention for its use of crowdfunding, a strategy that was considered a "breakthrough" at the time. That same year, she was cast as Drew Barrymore's "charming and funny" stepsister in Ever After, a post-feminist re-imagining of the Cinderella fairy tale. The film was a commercial and critical success upon its release in 1998.

In 1999, Lynskey appeared in four features: teen comedy Detroit Rock City; period drama The Cherry Orchard; British gangster drama Shooters; and the cult hit But I'm a Cheerleader, which is often referred to as one of the best LGBT films ever made. Next, she adopted a New Jersey accent for a key role as Piper Perabo's best friend in the romantic comedy Coyote Ugly (2000), and returned to New Zealand to star as Alice—a free-spirited drifter who embarks on a dangerous road trip—in the award-winning Snakeskin (2001), which screened at the Cannes Film Festival. For the latter, she received strong reviews and a nomination for Best Actress at the New Zealand Film Awards.

In 2002, Lynskey re-teamed with director Andy Tennant—whom she previously worked with on Ever After—to play a childhood acquaintance of Reese Witherspoon in the romantic comedy Sweet Home Alabama, which had a record-breaking opening weekend in North America. In recent years, the scene in which Lynskey's character (Lurlynn) nurses her baby in a crowded bar has been noted for its cultural relevance. Next, she appeared alongside Katie Holmes in psychological thriller Abandon, the directorial debut of Stephen Gaghan. The film received negative reviews from critics, but Lynskey's performance was considered to be one of its strong points, with Todd McCarthy of Variety pointing out that she "does some self-conscious scene stealing". That same year, she made her television debut in Rose Red, a miniseries written by Stephen King. The series was a ratings hit with an average of 18.5 million viewers over three consecutive nights.

2003–2011: Supporting film roles and Two and a Half Men 

In 2003, Lynskey played the role of Amy Brand—a writer for The New Republic—in Shattered Glass, a film based on the career of former journalist Stephen Glass (played by Hayden Christensen). Jeff Otto of IGN called it "a tension-filled drama with great performances", while Andrew Sarris felt it was "as well executed as any movie I've seen this year", noting that "the performances of … Ms. Sevigny, Ms. Dawson and Ms. Lynskey do more than complement Mr. Christensen's central characterization; they provide a sane backdrop for [his] pathological deceptions to steadily unravel against". Later that year, she landed the part of Rose, the devious but lovable neighbor of Charlie Harper (played by Charlie Sheen) on the CBS sitcom Two and a Half Men. After initially appearing in the pilot episode as a guest character, Lynskey was invited to become a series regular, and went on to appear frequently throughout the show's first two seasons. Despite leaving the main cast in 2005 to concentrate on film work—a decision that executive producer Chuck Lorre said he had "a lot of respect for"—she continued to make guest appearances on the show up until its final episode, which aired in February 2015.

In 2006, Lynskey appeared as the wife of Rene Gagnon (played by Jesse Bradford) in the Clint Eastwood-directed war epic Flags of Our Fathers. Writing for the Honolulu Star-Advertiser, Burl Burlingame called it "the richest testament Hollywood has yet made about the paroxysm of World War II ... an astounding movie on every level", while Peter Travers of Rolling Stone believed it was "a film of awesome power and blistering provocation". The following year, she played one of the principal characters—a woman desperate to get away from her abusive husband—on the short-lived television series Drive, which was cancelled by FOX midway through its first season run. In her review for the Los Angeles Times of the series' first two episodes, Mary McNamara described Lynskey as "especially compelling".

In 2008, Lynskey had a supporting role in the three-part Western miniseries Comanche Moon, which aired on CBS. The series received mixed reviews from critics, but People commented that Lynskey's performance was among the "best" in the cast. Later that year, she returned once again to New Zealand to star in the romantic drama Show of Hands, for which she earned a nomination for Best Actress at the Qantas Film and Television Awards.

Lynskey received strong reviews in 2009 for her appearance in Away We Go, a comedy-drama directed by Sam Mendes, where she played a woman who has suffered a series of miscarriages. Referring to the scene in which her character (Munch) performs a pole dance in front of her grieving husband, Wesley Morris of The Boston Globe stated: "Lynskey dramatizes sadness and dysfunction with quiet, moving physicality. [Her] character's whole life is there in her long face and drooping limbs. It's the best performance in the movie". Next, she co-starred as Matt Damon's wife, Ginger, in Steven Soderbergh's comedic biographical drama The Informant!. Based on real events, the film was described as "devilish fun" by Rolling Stone, while Geoffrey Macnab of The Independent noted that Lynskey provided "sterling support". During promotion of the film in September that year, Soderbergh told the Los Angeles Times:

While making the film, Soderbergh discouraged Lynskey from contacting the real person on which her character was based, as he wanted her to reach her own conclusion about whether Ginger had been complicit in her husband's crimes. "I decided she had no idea what was going on", she later said. "She was trusting, she was the kind of wife who thinks her job is to stay in the house and take care of the kids ... even though some things didn't necessarily add up ... She wasn't asking too many questions". Lynskey counts her time working on The Informant! as one of her favorite professional experiences.

Also in 2009, Lynskey appeared as Edward Norton's pregnant fiancée in Tim Blake Nelson's black comedy Leaves of Grass, with Seongyong Cho of RogerEbert.com writing that her performance was one of the key contributors to the film's "quirky charm", and as the younger sister of George Clooney's character in Up in the Air. The latter, directed by Jason Reitman, was nominated in six categories—including Best Picture—at the 82nd Academy Awards. Reitman had never before chosen a foreigner to play the part of an American in one of his films, but Lynskey said she "tricked" him into giving her the role of Julie by avoiding conversation with him during her audition, thus concealing her real accent. Reitman said he was "thrilled" by this. In October 2009, Lynskey was presented with a Spotlight Award at the Hollywood Film Festival.

In 2010, Lynskey had a starring role in Helena from the Wedding, which Jon Frosch of The Hollywood Reporter called a "wise, luminous low-budget comedy", adding, "The actors form a seamless ensemble, but [the film] belongs to ... Lynskey". The following year, she starred opposite Kurt Russell in the sports drama Touchback, and received praise for her portrayal of Cindy—a recovering drug addict—in Win Win, where she co-starred with Paul Giamatti. In his review of the latter for The Hollywood Reporter, David Rooney commended the film's director (Tom McCarthy) for his "unerring touch with minor-key character-based comedy and emotionally honest drama", while noting that Lynskey "brings welcome soft shadings to the story's disruptive element". Meanwhile, Mary Pols stated in her review for Time that "[Lynskey] has become one of the most reliably intriguing supporting actresses in film ... she had [parts in] Away We Go, The Informant! and Up in the Air ... she was wonderful in all three. In [this] she gives a very different kind of performance and is even better".

2012–2016: Transition to leading film roles, critical acclaim, and Togetherness 

In 2012, Lynskey appeared alongside Steve Carell in Lorene Scafaria's comedy Seeking a Friend for the End of the World, and had a key role as the teenage main character's sexually abusive Aunt Helen in The Perks of Being a Wallflower, a drama based on the novel of the same name. Due to the nature of her character in the latter, Lynskey said it had been a difficult decision to take the part. Also that year, she starred in the romantic comedy Putzel, with Mark Hinson of the Tallahassee Democrat writing that her performance—in the role of Sally, a professional dancer and the love interest of the main character—"steals the show ... [the film] sparks to life whenever the charming Lynskey arrives on the screen"; while in his review for Redefine, Allen Huang described her as "delightful" and "deftly believable".

Lynskey's portrayal of Amy Minsky—a divorcee who finds herself having to move back in with her parents—in Hello I Must Be Going (2012) was particularly well received by critics. For the first time in her career, Lynskey appeared in every scene throughout the film; she described the experience as "a lot of pressure", and said that she initially assumed the part would be given to somebody like Michelle Williams or Maggie Gyllenhaal. Speaking of his decision to cast Lynskey, director Todd Louiso said, "I knew if I cast her, the film had the potential to resonate on a thousand different levels". In his review for the Los Angeles Times, Kenneth Turan wrote:

USA Today praised the film for being "funny, well-written, involving and emotionally honest", while noting that "Lynskey brings dimension and intelligence" and a "sympathetic blend of humor, dignity and naturalness to the role". The performance earned her a nomination for the Gotham Independent Film Award for Breakthrough Actor. In 2015, Screen Rant placed Lynskey's portrayal of Amy at #6 on their list of the '20 Best Acting Performances of the Last 5 Years'.

In 2013, Lynskey had a starring role in The Big Ask, an independent comedy-drama. The film received a mixed reception from critics, but Lynskey's portrayal of Hannah was praised. In April the following year, she was named an Emerging Master honoree at the RiverRun International Film Festival. Her next role was in Happy Christmas (2014), where she played Kelly, an aspiring novelist whose passion for writing is rekindled when her sister-in-law (played by Anna Kendrick) comes to visit. The film drew attention for being almost entirely improvised. Stephen Holden of The New York Times commented, "The performances in Happy Christmas are so natural that the actors melt into their characters", while other critics singled out Lynskey as a highlight. Later that year, she appeared as Amy Poehler's best friend in David Wain's satirical romantic comedy They Came Together, and played the female leads in We'll Never Have Paris and Goodbye to All That. In his review of the latter, Bilge Ebiri said that Lynskey's portrayal of a frustrated wife was "fantastic", while Variety described her as "heartbreaking ... This is what falling out of love looks like. It's not screaming matches and altercations; it's apathy and indifference". Next, she provided the voice of Beatrice, an ill-tempered bluebird, for the Cartoon Network miniseries Over the Garden Wall. Kevin Johnson of The A.V. Club noted, "Lynskey steals the show with her amazing putdowns and passive-aggressiveness, smartly avoiding overdone sass or sarcasm". The series went on to receive three Creative Arts Emmy Awards, including Outstanding Animated Program.

From 2015 to 2016, Lynskey played Michelle Pierson on the HBO series Togetherness, which focused on the lives of two couples living under the same roof. The show—which was created by the Duplass brothers—ran for two seasons, and was praised for its intimate storytelling and the performances of its cast. Robert Lloyd of the Los Angeles Times wrote, "[Lynskey] is all deep waters and live wires; soft and steely, trying on new personas for size, her Michelle becomes the series' gravitational center. You can feel her feeling". The performance earned Lynskey a nomination for the 2015 Critics' Choice Television Award for Best Supporting Actress in a Comedy Series. Despite missing out on a Primetime Emmy Award nomination in 2016, she was singled out as a worthy candidate in the run-up to that year's ceremony. In March 2016, it was announced that HBO had decided not to renew Togetherness for a third season. Lynskey later compared this to having her "heart broken by someone I'm still in love with".

For her role in The Intervention (2016), Lynskey received the U.S. Dramatic Special Jury Award for Individual Performance at the Sundance Film Festival. In his review for IndieWire, Russ Fischer pointed out Lynskey's "tremendously good comic timing", while Ethan Anderton of /Film noted, "Lynskey is the standout, delivering a performance that is genuine, funny and touching all at the same time". The film was the directorial debut of actress Clea DuVall, who wrote the character of Annie, an uptight alcoholic, specifically for Lynskey. She sought the help of a therapist before the film went into production to prepare herself for working with DuVall, a close friend of several years: "I didn't want anything to happen to our friendship and a big challenge was being able to stick up for myself and my perspective in regard to the script and this character". Also that year, she starred opposite Robert Webb in the BBC Two comedy pilot Our Ex-Wife, and had leading roles in the independent features Rainbow Time, Little Boxes, and The Great & The Small. Joe Leydon of Variety described her performance in the latter as  "quietly devastating".

2017–present: Continued success, awards recognition, and Yellowjackets 
Lynskey's performance in the Netflix crime thriller I Don't Feel at Home in This World Anymore (2017) was roundly praised by critics. The film's director (Macon Blair) wrote the character of Ruth, a downtrodden vigilante who teams up with her neighbor (played by Elijah Wood) to track down a burglar, with Lynskey in mind. The role proved to be physically challenging, as it involved stunt work and the use of prosthetics. Peter Debruge of Variety commended Blair for giving Lynskey "something unforgettable to do" and felt that she delivered her "best work yet", while Time Out described her as "seething and magnetic". In his review for RogerEbert.com, Matt Zoller Seitz said:

The film was awarded the Grand Jury Prize at Sundance, while Lynskey received a nomination for the Gotham Independent Film Award for Best Actress.

Following the release of I Don't Feel at Home in This World Anymore, Lynskey had starring roles that same year as the parent of a troubled high school student in the controversial drama And Then I Go; a defense lawyer in the Australian miniseries Sunshine, for which she received a Golden Nymph Award nomination; the mother of a girl with supernatural powers in The Changeover; and in the horror film XX, in which her character frantically tries to hide her husband's body after finding him dead. In her review of the latter, Stephanie Zacharek of Time wrote, "The picture has a wry, comic charge, and Lynskey, terrific as always, brings a grace note of pathos to the wicked proceedings".

Lynskey had a starring role in the independent drama Sadie in 2018, playing a woman struggling to raise her daughter while her husband is on a tour of duty in Afghanistan. Variety described the film as "quietly absorbing", adding that Lynskey's work was "strong" and "compelling"; while Frank Scheck of The Hollywood Reporter wrote, "It's no surprise that Lynskey, who has quietly [been] establishing herself as one of indie cinema's finest actors, is once again superb in her emotionally complex turn". Next, she appeared in the principal role of Molly Strand on the first season of Castle Rock, a psychological horror series based on characters and settings from the novels of Stephen King. The series premiered on Hulu in July 2018 and garnered positive reviews, particularly for the cast; Paste referred to Lynskey as "delicately complex", while Alan Sepinwall of Rolling Stone felt the show was "the latest example of how much humanity and grounding [Lynskey] can bring to the most surreal and macabre of stories ... a tradition that goes back to when she was a teenager in Heavenly Creatures". The series was later renewed for a second season; however, due to the anthological nature of the narrative, it featured a different set of actors.

Between April and May 2020, Lynskey co-starred with Cate Blanchett in the nine-part miniseries Mrs. America, a political drama centred on the career of conservative activist Phyllis Schlafly. The series ran on FX on Hulu and was widely acclaimed by critics, with James Poniewozik of The New York Times calling it "breathtaking ... a meticulously created and observed mural that finds the germ of contemporary America in the striving of righteously mad women". Lynskey's portrayal of the real-life Rosemary Thomson, a staunch supporter of Schlafly's, was described as "delightful" and a "standout" among the cast. She later called working with Blanchett "one of the great experiences of my life".

In 2021, Lynskey played the principal role of Hannah—a layabout stoner who unwittingly lands a job as a tour guide in a historic mansion—in the buddy comedy Lady of the Manor, the directorial debut of actor Justin Long and his brother, Christian. Lynskey said that she agreed to take the part because "the thought of being in sweatpants and just acting like I was high for a whole movie was so freeing". Critics were dismissive of the film's reliance on scatological humour, but Lynskey's performance was well received, with Angie Han of The Hollywood Reporter commenting that she "brings the same airtight commitment to hot mess Hannah that she does to all her varied roles" and finding her chemistry with co-star Judy Greer to be "warm and genuine"; while Screen Rant felt that she "shines as ... the rudderless, classless ... screw-up. [She] unabashedly embraces physical humor ... and really commits to the gags. There are a few laugh-out-loud moments in the film, and Lynskey is at the center of all of them". Adam McKay's satirical tackling of the climate change crisis, Don't Look Up, was Lynskey's second film role of 2021. Her portrayal of June—the wife of Leonardo DiCaprio's Randall—was picked out as a highlight among the ensemble cast, with David Rooney of The Hollywood Reporter describing her as "terrific", and IndieWire'''s David Ehrlich writing: "[She's] low-key brilliant as [DiCaprio's] clear-headed wife, her grounded performance paving the way for a surprisingly poignant [climax]". In January 2022, it was reported that Don't Look Up had set a record for the most viewings of any film on Netflix (the film's distributor) in a single week, making it the third most-watched item in the company's history.

On the Showtime series Yellowjackets, which premiered on 14 November 2021, Lynskey stars in the role of Shauna Sadecki (née Shipman), a suburban housewife and mother who, along with three old high school friends (played by Tawny Cypress, Christina Ricci and Juliette Lewis), has been harbouring secrets about a plane crash that occurred 25 years ago. The series was praised by Judy Berman of Time for its "psychological realism" and ability to mix different genres together successfully, while Lacy Baugher Milas of Paste felt it was "one of the fall television season's most compelling new offerings, a twisty mystery that … grounds its story in a specifically female experience in a way that other [shows] like this have never bothered to try". The cast were unanimously commended for their performances, but Rolling Stone believed "The standout ... is Lynskey. She's always great, but Shauna feels like the ... part she's been waiting her whole career to play". In a similar review, The Guardian agreed that "Lynskey does by far the most emotional heavy lifting of the series". Lynskey said it was the character's "internalized rage" that attracted her to the role, as well as "a real dark streak that I … loved and was also terrified of". She told the New York Post: 

 It was announced on 7 December 2021 that Lynskey had been nominated for the 2022 Critics' Choice Award for Best Actress in a Drama Series for her portrayal of Shauna. She was revealed as the winner during the ceremony on 13 March 2022. She has since received various other accolades for the performance, including a nomination for the Primetime Emmy Award for Outstanding Lead Actress in a Drama Series.

In May 2022, Lynskey starred as Betty Gore—the victim of real-life murderess Candy Montgomery, played by Jessica Biel—in the true crime miniseries Candy, which aired over five consecutive nights on Hulu. Despite a mixed critical reaction, with some finding the show too similar to others of its type, Biel and Lynskey's work was unanimously praised: Kristen Baldwin of Entertainment Weekly felt that "Lynskey ... captures the sadness and seething resentment of a woman stifled by the confines of stay-at-home motherhood", while Brian Tallerico of RogerEbert.com said, "She does so much with just a sigh or defeated body language". Writing for the Chicago Sun-Times, Richard Roeper called the series "a fascinating psychological character study", adding that "Although Candy devotes the majority of screen time to telling events from the title character's point of view, Lynskey gives Betty a memorable and constant presence ... [she] was clearly depressed and in need of help ... and through Lynskey's performance, we find that tragic and heartbreaking". It was announced in December 2022 that Lynskey had been nominated for Critics' Choice and Satellite Awards for her portrayal of Betty.

In The Last of Us—an adaptation of the 2013 action-adventure game—Lynskey appeared in the guest role of Kathleen (an original character created especially for the series), the "ruthless leader of a revolutionary movement". It premiered on HBO in January 2023 to strong reviews: Stephen Kelly of BBC Culture called it "The best video game adaptation ever", noting that Lynskey's "chillingly violent and vengeful" performance was "superb", while Daniel Fienberg felt she was "excellent ... thoroughly effective" in his review for The Hollywood Reporter.

 Acting style 
Lynskey describes herself as a character actress. "Even when I'm reading a script where I'm supposed to be looking at the lead role, I'll find myself gravitating toward some small weirdo in a few scenes instead".

Regarding her acting technique, Lynskey has said, "I don't have any training ... so the only thing I have to go on is my own instinct. So if a director gives me a note that doesn't feel like it's in line with my instinct, it's very hard for me to do something that ... feels like a lie. So, I'll argue it, and I can get kind of feisty because I feel it in my body, I know what is right".

Asked by a journalist in 2012 about how she felt being cast—up to that point in her career—as a supporting player rather than a lead, Lynskey said it was something she had thought about a lot, and that the "meaty" parts are mostly written for men, or actresses like Meryl Streep. "For a while, I was only being sent fat-girl parts", she said. "Seriously? Sometimes I feel like I'm making some kind of radical statement because I'm a size 6". She told a different journalist that same year, "It's been a big issue that I'm not [famous] … I'll audition for something and then the feedback has been, 'The director wants you, the creative people want you, but the studio is saying no' … but I understand. People are investing a lot of money and they want somewhat of a guarantee". Lynskey has subsequently taken on leading roles in numerous independent films and has been labelled an "indie queen".

Speaking in 2017 about taking risks in her film work, Lynskey said, "I want to tell stories about women who are interesting and complicated and not like people you've seen before ... There aren't that many opportunities [to do that] except in the independent film world. I've made films that have cost $50,000 for the entire film. If you're willing to work like that, you get chances to do really creative, interesting stuff".

Lynskey is often complimented on her ability to perform an American accent. She attributes this to staying with Joss Whedon when she first moved to Los Angeles: "When I came here, I stayed in his guest bedroom ... I watched movie after movie and learned American accents". Tim Blake Nelson recalled that when she auditioned for the part of Colleen in Leaves of Grass, "she came in and auditioned for me and then… she opened [her] mouth and started talking in a New Zealand accent and I just couldn't believe it, because her south-eastern Oklahoma accent was so spot on, and it's a very specific accent".

Lynskey is known for her ability to improvise, and regularly uses dreamwork in preparation for a role.

 Other work 
In 2012, Lynskey voiced an animated version of herself in an airline safety video for Air New Zealand.

In February 2013, she participated in a Live Read performance of the 1992 film Glengarry Glen Ross. The read-through was directed by Jason Reitman, who assembled a cast of women to read the all-male script; Lynskey portrayed the role of George Aaronow (originally played by Alan Arkin).

Between 2014–2015, Lynskey featured on several occasions as part of The Thrilling Adventure Hour, a staged production and podcast in the style of old-time radio, which was held monthly in Los Angeles.

In 2015, she starred in the music video for the song "Waiting on Love" by Nicki Bluhm and The Gramblers, alongside Jason Ritter.

In June 2018, Lynskey was invited to become a member of the Academy of Motion Picture Arts and Sciences.

 Personal life 
In 2001, Lynskey met American actor Jimmi Simpson during the filming of Rose Red, in which they both appeared. They became engaged in 2005 and were married on 14 April 2007, in a chapel on Lake Hayes, near Queenstown, New Zealand. Lynskey filed for divorce from Simpson on 25 September 2012, citing irreconcilable differences. The divorce was finalized on 23 May 2014. In February 2017, Lynskey announced that she was engaged to Jason Ritter, whom she had been dating for four years. In December the following year, they became parents to a daughter. They were married in 2020.  

Lynskey lives in Los Angeles. She is a close friend of Clea DuVall, whom she met when they appeared together in But I'm a Cheerleader''. Lynskey became a vegetarian at age 10 after learning about sheep farming, but now identifies as a pescetarian. She suffers from misophonia.

Lynskey has been open about her struggle with an eating disorder, which lasted for several years. Speaking in 2016, she said that she was "very unwell for a long time", and later recalled that "even when I was …  I would still be shamed in wardrobe fittings for not being sample size".

Filmography

Film

Television

Podcasts

Music videos

Awards and nominations

Film

Awards Circuit Community Awards

Central Ohio Film Critics Association

Chicago Alt.Film Fest

CinEuphoria Awards

Denver Film Critics Society

Fargo Film Festival

Gold Derby Awards

Gotham Independent Film Awards

Hollywood Film Awards

New Zealand Film and Television Awards

RiverRun International Film Festival

San Diego Film Critics Society Awards

Screen Actors Guild Awards

Sundance Film Festival

Visa Entertainment Screen Awards

Washington D.C. Area Film Critics Association Awards

Television

Autostraddle TV Awards

Awards Daily Cooler Awards

Behind the Voice Actors Awards

Critics' Choice Super Awards

Critics' Choice Television Awards

Dorian Awards

Gold Derby Television Awards

Gotham Independent Film Awards

Gracie Awards

Hollywood Critics Association

Independent Spirit Awards

International Online Cinema Awards

Lady Parts TV Awards

Monte-Carlo Television Festival

Online Film & Television Association

Pena de Prata

Primetime Emmy Awards

Satellite Awards

Saturn Awards

TCA Awards

References

External links 

 
 
 
 
 

1977 births
Living people
20th-century New Zealand actresses
21st-century New Zealand actresses
New Zealand expatriate actresses in the United States
New Zealand film actresses
New Zealand television actresses
New Zealand voice actresses
New Zealand people of Irish descent
People from New Plymouth
People educated at New Plymouth Girls' High School
People with misophonia
Victoria University of Wellington alumni